Elmstead Pit is a geological Site of Special Scientific Interest in Elmstead in the London Borough of Bromley. Formerly known as Rock Pits, it is a small area of 0.05 hectare. It is a Geological Conservation Review site.

The pit exposes an important layer of the Oldhaven or Blackheath Beds laid down about 50 million years ago during the Eocene epoch. It has a rich and diverse selection of fossil fauna from a sub-tidal estuarine environment. Fossils include molluscs, sharks' teeth and fish scales. The geological features help to explain the changes in the disposition of land and sea in the London area during the Eocene.

The site is located opposite Elmstead Woods railway station, and there is no public access.

See also

 List of Sites of Special Scientific Interest in Greater London

References

Sites of Special Scientific Interest in London
Geology of London
Geological Conservation Review sites